Homps may refer to:

Homps, Aude, a commune in Aude department, France
Homps, Gers, a commune in Gers department, France

People with the surname
Emilio Homps, Argentine Olympic sailor

See also
Homp, a surname